SOLAR may refer to:

SOLAR, a space observatory on ISS
SOLAR Records, a record company
SOLAR Taeyang's solo album

See also
 Solar (disambiguation)